The Adeseun Ogundoyin Polytechnic, Eruwa is a state government higher education institution located in Eruwa, Oyo State, Nigeria. The current acting Rector is Peter Adejumo.

History 
The Adeseun Ogundoyin Polytechnic, Eruwa was established in 2014. It was formerly known as The Ibarapa Polytechnic, Eruwa.

Courses 
The institution offers the following courses;

 Fine Art
 Business Administration & Management
 Office Technology And Management
 Estate Management And Valuation
 Statistics
 Arts And Industrial Design
 Computer Engineering
 Purchasing And Supply
 Electrical/Electronic Engineering Technology
 Science Laboratory Technology
 Computer Science
 Mechanical Engineering Technology
 Civil Engineering Technology
 Library And Information Science
 Architectural Technology
 Fashion Design
 Fashion Design And Clothing Technology
 Mass Communication

References 

Universities and colleges in Nigeria
2014 establishments in Nigeria